Emissions from the Monolith was an annual heavy metal festival that primarily featured doom metal and sludge metal bands, and was widely considered to be the premiere heavy/doom/sludge metal festival in the US. The festival was entirely organized by Greg Barratt at the nyabinghi in Youngstown, OH.   The festival completed its ninth and final year in 2007, at Emo's, in Austin, Texas.

Bands featured by year

1: April 14–15, 2000
Rebreather, Spirit Caravan, Karma to Burn, Boulder, Red Giant, Mustache, Wicker Man, Penance, Six Sigma, Honeymaid, Throttlerod, Bottom, Bongzilla, Cuda, Tummler, Kung Pao, Nice Cat

2: May 25–27, 2001
Spirit Caravan, Bongzilla, Raging Slab, Earthride, Boulder, Warhorse, Disengage, Slow Horse, Red Giant, Oversoul, Tummler, Throttlerod, Penance, Cuda, Gonzalez, Kung Pao, Five Horse Johnson, Unorthodox, Halfway to Gone, Sunnshine, Rebreather, Plaster, Witch Mountain, Weedeater, Soulpreacher, Dragon Green, Burnout, Sea of Green, Pale Divine, Positraction, Shuteye, Rockcatcher, The Want, Raging Slab, Clock Eating Planet

3: September 8–9, 2001
(Festival held in Chicago, IL at the Double Door)

Weedeater, Boulder, Rebreather, Bongzilla, Sea of Green, Kung Pao, Men of Porn, Penance, Burnout, Warhorse, Place of Skulls, Cuda, Operator Generator, Red Giant, Dragon Green, Lung Brush, Suplecs, Dixie Witch, Wickerman, Nova Driver, Drunkenmaster, Kneel Drill

4: May 24–26, 2002
Spirit Caravan, Disengage, Stinking Lizaveta, Red Giant, Men of Porn (2 sets), Wooly Mammoth, Black Mantra, The Atomic Bitchwax, Weedeater, Penance, Boulder, Rammer, Rebreather, Dragon Green, Jumbo's Killcrane, Fistula, Sofa King Killer, Bruahaha, Orange Goblin, Alabama Thunderpussy, Bottom, JJ Paradise Player's Club, Milligram, Kung Pao, Tummler, Lost Goat, Dixie Witch, The Brought Low, Burnout, Lamont, The Rubes

5: May 23–25, 2003
Halfway to Gone, Tummler, Penance, Throttlerod, Erik Larson Band, All Night, RPG, Floor, The Atomic Bitchwax, Mastodon, Weedeater, Boulder, Scissorfight, Bongzilla, Acid Ape, Keelhaul, Meatjack, Gil Mantera's Party Dream, Rwake, Fistula, Abdullah, Burnout, The Hidden Hand, Solace, Acid King, Disengage, JJ Paradise Player's Club, Stinking Lizaveta, Dixie Witch, Lo Freq, Volume, Pelican, The Rubes, Red Giant, Sofa King Killer

6: May 28–30, 2004
Five Horse Johnson, A Thousand Knives of Fire, Beaten Back to Pure, Puddy, Zebulon Pike, Swarm of the Lotus, Delicious, Unsane, Meatjack, Tummler, Red Giant, Solace, Bongzilla, RPG, Kylesa, Starchild, Alabama Thunderpussy, Poobah, Dixie Witch, Kung Pao, Stinking Lizaveta, Rebreather, The Brought Low,  Rwake, Buried at Sea, The Mighty Nimbus, Orange Goblin, Mastodon, Weedeater, Keelhaul, Pelican, Dozer, Dove, Lamont, Yob, Fistula, Cudamantra, Trephine;   Place of Skulls and The Hidden Hand played back-to-back resulting in a brief Saint Vitus reunion jam.

7: May 26–29, 2005
Bible of the Devil, Electro Quarterstaff, Test-Site, King Valley, Amplified Heat, GreatDayForUp, Baroness, Dixie Witch, Darediablo, Torche, Fistula, Mouth of the Architect, Beaten Back to Pure, Pale Divine, Devil to Pay, Raging Slab, Weedeater, Alabama Thunderpussy, Honky, Sons of Otis, Rebreather, Rwake, Roadsaw, Lamont, Delicious, Hope and Suicide, Minsk, Eyehategod, Today Is the Day, Pig Destroyer, Keelhaul, Meatjack, Stinking Lizaveta, Yob, Solace, Player's Club, Debris Inc., Disengage, Lair of the Minotaur, dot(.), SuperHeavyGoatAss

8: May 25–28, 2006
Stinking Lizaveta, Kylesa, Graves at Sea, Conifer, Rosetta, Ultralord, Orange Goblin, Scissorfight, Electro Quarterstaff, Facedowninshit, Burnout, Rue, Colour Haze, Dixie Witch, Grief, Brought Low, Lamont, Low Divide, Baroness, Village of Dead Roads, Boris, Sunn O))), The Atomic Bitchwax, Weedeater, Rwake, Tummler, A Thousand Knives of Fire, Minsk, Trephine, Hyatari, Unfortunaut, Grey, We're All Gonna Die, Year Long Disaster

9: May 25–27, 2007
(Festival moves to Austin, TX at Emo's)

Kylesa, Amplified Heat, The Makai, Damnweevil, SuperHeavyGoatAss, Samothrace, Throttlerod, Mess with the Bull, Bible of the Devil, Test-Site, Valkyrie, Beast, Lord, Lord by Fire, Imperial Battlesnake, Dixie Witch, Middian, RPG, Minsk, Indian, Unfortunaut, Collapsar, Giant Squid, Blue Cheer, Weedeater, Rwake, Black Cobra, Delicious, Skeletonwitch, Deadbird, Suzukiton, Hognose

References

Heavy metal festivals in the United States